Add MS 29987 is a mediaeval Tuscan musical manuscript dating from the late fourteenth or early fifteenth century, held in the British Library in London. It contains a number of polyphonic Italian Trecento madrigals, ballate, sacred mass movements, and motets, and 15 untexted monophonic instrumental dances, which are among the earliest purely instrumental pieces in the Western musical tradition. The manuscript apparently belonged to the de' Medici family in the fifteenth century, and by 1670 was in the possession of Carlo di Tommaso Strozzi; it was in the British Museum from 1876, where it was catalogued as item 29987 of the Additional manuscripts series. It is now in the British Library.

The manuscript 

The manuscript appears to have belonged to the de' Medici family of the Republic of Florence in the fifteenth century –  the first folio has the de' Medici arms in red, gold, blue and green; these are in the "augmented" form granted by Louis XI in 1465, with the arms of France in the upper central ball. By 1670 it was in the possession of Carlo di Tommaso Strozzi. On 8 April 1876 it was acquired by the British Museum from the antiquarian bookseller Bernard Quaritch; it was catalogued as item 29987 of the Additional manuscripts series. It is now in the British Library.

There are six flyleaves at the front, one from 1957, three from 1876 and two from the seventeenth century, of which the first has a list in the hand of Carlo di Tommaso Strozzi of the composers represented; two flyleaves at the back date from 1876 and 1957. The binding in half leather is from 1957, over older thick wooden boards.

Add 29987 is a part of a larger manuscript of at least 185 pages, as the surviving leaves were originally numbered 98–185. The pages are ruled with eight five-line staves in red, and the music is written in full (black) mensural notation, with only occasional use of void ("white") notes and red colouration. It is carelessly written in one principal and several other scribal hands; the musical text is corrupted in many places by a later hand, which altered the rhythms and added inappropriate rests.

The exact date of the manuscript remains uncertain; estimates range from the late fourteenth century to about 1425. The music dates from 1340–1400; one piece, number 118, is clearly of later date, and numbers 115–117 may also be somewhat later than most of the others. The geographical origin of the manuscript is equally uncertain; it is thought to be either Tuscany or Umbria. The titles of two of the instrumental pieces, "Isabella" and "Principio di virtù", may suggest a connection to Perugia, which was ruled between 1400 and 1402 by Gian Galeazzo Visconti; Visconti was, through his marriage to Isabella, Countess of Vertus, the comte de Vertus, or, in Italian, the Conte di Virtù. However Visconti was also Duke of Milan, and the manuscript may thus be connected with that city.

The works 

Add MS 29987 contains 119 pieces of music; however, three of them are copied twice, so there are 116 different pieces. Of these, 45 are ballate, 35 or 36 (if a fragment is counted) are madrigals, 15 are instrumental pieces under the general title of "istampitta" or estampie, 8 are cacce and 3 are virelais. There are also a motet and a "Chançonete tedesce" or canzonetta tedesca, and 7 liturgical works, kyrie, gloria, credo, antiphon, two sequences and a hymn; the last piece is untexted, but may be a madrigal. Forty-three of the pieces, including all the instrumental works, are unica.

Eighty-two of the pieces, all but one of them polyphonic, can be attributed to their composers, either because the composer's name is given in the manuscript or by comparison with other sources. Half of these are by either Francesco Landini (29) or Niccolò da Perugia (12 and a fragment). There are seven works by Jacopo da Bologna, five by each of Bartolino da Padova, Giovanni da Cascia and Lorenzo da Firenze, and three by each of Bonaiuto Corsini, Donato da Cascia, Gherardello da Firenze and Vincenzo da Rimini. Andrea da Firenze, Jacopo Pianelaio da Firenze, Paolo da Firenze, Rosso de Collegrana and Thomas de Celano are each represented by a single piece. There is one ballata by Guglielmus and Egidius de Francia, and a madrigal by Guglielmus alone.

List of contents of the manuscript
The 119 pieces in the manuscript are:

Recordings 
The following discs contain some of the instrumental dances found in this manuscript:

 Landini e la musica fiorentina – Secolo XIV, Ensemble Micrologus, dir. Patrizia Bovi (Opus 111, OP 30 112)
 Istampitta – Musiques de fête à la cour des Visconti en Italie à la fin du XIVe siècle, Alla Francesca, dir. Pierre Hamon, Carlo Rizzo (Opus 111, OP 30 325)Contains three salterelli, the Lamento di Tristano and the istampitte: Isabella, Tre Fontane, Principio di virtù and In Pro.
 Landini and Italian Ars Nova, Alla Francesca, dir. Pierre Hamon (Opus 111, 60-9206).Contains the istampitta Belicha.
 Tristan et Yseut, Alla Francesca, dir. Pierre Hamon and Brigitte Lesne (Zig-Zag Territoires, ZZT 051002), 2005.Contains the Lamento di Tristano.
 Troubadours – Trouvères – Minstrels, Studio der frühen Musik, dir. Thomas Binkley (Teldec)Contains a salterello and the Chançonete tedesche Nbs 1 and 3.
 Llibre Vermell – Robin et Marion, Studio der Frühen Musik, dir. Thomas Binkley (Teldec)Contains the trotto
 Estampie: Instrumentalmusik des Mittelalters, Studio der Frühen Musik, participants in the Schola Cantorum Basiliensis, dir. Thomas Binkley (EMI Electrola LP 1C 063-30 122), 1974; (reissued on CD 8 26491 2), 2000. Contains the Istanpitte Ghaetta, Parlamento, Belicha, Isabella, and Principio di Virtu, together with the Lamento di Tristano/Rotta, La Manfredina/Rotta, and one Salterello
 The Art of Courtly Love, Early Music Consort of London, dir. David Munrow (Virgin Veritas)Contains the istampitta Tre Fontane
 Early Music Festival, Early Music Consort of London, dir. David Munrow (London Records, 2 CD), 1998.Contains the istampitta Ghaetta, the Lamento di Tristano, La Manfredina, the trotto and a salterello.
 Lamento di Tristano, Capella de Ministrers, dir. Carles Magraner (CDM), 2003.Contains the istampitte Belicha, Chominciamento di gioia, Ghaetta, In pro, Isabella and Parlamento, the Lamento di Tristano, La Manfredina and three saltarelli.
 Narcisso speculando, Mala Punica, dir. Pedro Memelsdorff (Harmonia Mundi), 2002.Contains the istampitta Isabella
 Danses, Danseryes, Musica Antiqua, dir. Christian Mendoze (Disques Pierre Verany)Contains the Lamento di Tristano, La Manfredina, the trotto and two saltarelli.
 La Lira d'Esperia, Jordi Savall and Pedro Estevan (Auvidis Astrée).Contains the istampitta In pro, the Lamento di Tristano, La Manfredina, the trotto and two saltarelli.
 Music for a Medieval Banquet, The Newberry Consort, dir. Mary Springfels (Harmonia Mundi)Contains the istampitte Cominciamento di gioia, Principio de virtù and the trotto
 Futuro antico I, Angelo Branduardi (EMI), 1996.Contains a Salterello, the Lamento di Tristano and La Rotta
 The Lady and the Unicorn, John Renbourn (Transatlantic Records), 1970. Contains adaptations of the Trotto, Saltarrello, Lamento Di Tristan and La Rotta.
 Chominciamento di gioia: Virtuoso Dance Music from the Time of Boccaccio's Decamerone, Ensemble Unicorn (Naxos Records), 1994. Dedicated solely to this manuscript; contains adaptations of the Chominciamento di gioia, Lamento di Tristano, La Rotta, Belicha, Tre fontane, Parlamento, Principio di virtú, three salterelli, Trotto, Isabella, Ghaetta, In pro, and La Manfredina with its Rotta.
 A Dance in the Garden of Mirth: Medieval Instrumental Music, The Dufay Collective (Chandos Records CD, CHAN 9320), 1994. Includes Ghaetta, Belicha, Isabella, Trotto, and two salterelli.

References

Further reading 
 Jan ten Bokum (1967). De dansen van het trecento: Critische uitgave van de instrumentale dansen uit hs. Londen BM add. 29987 (musical, score, in Dutch). Utrecht: Instituut voor Muziekwetenschap der Rijksuniversiteit te Utrecht.
 Richard H. Hoppin (1980). Anthology of Mediaeval Music. [New York]: W.W. Norton. .

External links 

Facsimile
 Grove Music Online
 Review at Medieval Music Database
 Review at Digital Image Archive of Medieval Music
 Some pages in facsimile

14th-century books
14th-century manuscripts
Italian music
British Library additional manuscripts
Medieval music manuscript sources